The sārangī is a bowed, short-necked string instrument played in traditional music from South Asia – Punjabi folk music, Rajasthani folk music, and Boro folk music (there known as the serja) – in Pakistan, India and Bangladesh. It is said to most resemble the sound of the human voice through its ability to imitate vocal ornaments such as gamaks (shakes) and meends (sliding movements). The sarangi (Nepali) is a different instrument, traditional to Nepal.

History  

Sarangi derives its name from the bow of Lord Vishnu and probably as it is played with a bow it is named sarangi. According to some musicians, the word sarangi is a combination of two words: seh ('three' in Persian) and rangi ('coloured' in Persian) or Persian sad-rangi, sad for 'hundred' in Persian ('hundred coloured) corrupted as sarangi. The term seh-rangi represents the three melody strings. However, the most common folk etymology is that sarangi is derived from sol rang ('a hundred colours') indicating its adaptability to many styles of vocal music, its flexible tunability, and its ability to produce a large palette of tonal colour and emotional nuance.

The repertoire of sarangi players is traditionally very closely related to vocal music. Nevertheless, a concert with a solo sarangi as the main item will sometimes include a full-scale raag presentation with an extensive alap (the unmeasured improvisatory development of the raga) in increasing intensity (alap to jor to jhala) and several compositions in increasing tempo called bandish. As such, it could be seen as being on a par with other instrumental styles such as sitar, sarod, and bansuri.

It is rare to find a sarangi player who does not know the words of many classical compositions. The words are usually mentally present during the performance, and a performance almost always adheres to the conventions of vocal performances including the organisational structure, the types of elaboration, the tempo, the relationship between sound and silence, and the presentation of khyal and thumri compositions. The vocal quality of sarangi is in a separate category from, for instance, the so-called gayaki-ang of sitar which attempts to imitate the nuances of khyal while overall conforming to the structures and usually keeping to the gat compositions of instrumental music. (A gat is a composition set to a cyclic rhythm.)

The Nepali Sarangi is also a traditional stringed musical instrument of Nepal, commonly played by the Gaine or Gandarbha ethnic group but the form and repertoire of sarangi is more towards the folk music as compared to the heavy and classical form of the repertoire in India. In Nepal, Sarangi is viewed as an iconic musical instrument to identify the Gandarbha people.

Structure 

Carved from a single block of tun (red cedar) wood, the sarangi has a box-like shape with three hollow chambers: pet ('stomach'), chaati ('chest') and magaj ('brain'). The lower resonance chamber or pet is covered with parchment made out of goat skin on which a strip of thick leather is placed around the waist (and nailed on the back of the chamber) which supports the elephant-shaped bridge that is usually made of camel or buffalo bone. (Originally, it was made of ivory or Barasingha bone but now that is rare due to the ban in India). The bridge in turn supports the huge pressure of approximately 35–37 sympathetic steel or brass strings and three main gut strings that pass through it. The three main playing strings – the comparatively thicker gut strings – are bowed with a heavy horsehair bow and stopped not with the fingertips but with the nails, cuticles, and surrounding flesh. Talcum powder is applied to the fingers as a lubricant. The neck has ivory or bone platforms on which the fingers slide. The remaining strings are resonance strings or tarabs, numbering up to around 35–37, divided into four choirs having two sets of pegs, one on the right and one on the top. On the inside is a chromatically tuned row of 15 tarabs and on the right a diatonic row of nine tarabs each encompassing a full octave, plus one to three extra surrounding notes above or below the octave. Both these sets of tarabs pass from the main bridge to the right side set of pegs through small holes in the chaati supported by hollow ivory/bone beads. Between these inner tarabs and on either side of the main playing strings lie two more sets of longer tarabs, with five to six strings on the right set and six to seven strings on the left set. They pass from the main bridge over to two small, flat, wide, table-like bridges through the additional bridge towards the second peg set on top of the instrument. These are tuned to the important tones (swaras) of the raga. A properly tuned sarangi will hum and cry and will sound like melodious meowing, with tones played on any of the main strings eliciting echo-like resonances. A few sarangis use strings manufactured from the intestines of goats.

Pakistan 
Sarangi is a Mughal-era musical instrument. Sarangi decline in Pakistan began in the 1980s after the death of several master players. The instrument costs around Rs. 120,00/- (about $160).

Notable performers

Sarangi players in India
 Abdul Latif Khan (1934-2002)
 Aruna Narayan (born 1959)
 Ashique Ali Khan (1948-1999)
 Bharat Bhushan Goswami (b. 1955)
 Bundu Khan (1880-1955)
 Dhruba Ghosh (1957-2017)
 Ghulam Ali (Sarangi)  (b. 1975)
 Harsh Narayan (b. 1985)
 Manonmani (b. 2000)
 Murad Ali Khan
 Ramesh Mishra (1948-2017)
 Ram Narayan (b. 1927)
 Sabir Khan (Sarangi) (b. 1978)
 Sabri Khan (1927-2015)
 Siddiqui Ahmed Khan (1914-)
 Suhail Yusuf Khan (b. 1988)
 Kamal Sabri
 Dishad Khan
 Sultan Khan (1940-2011)
 Ustad Faiyaz Khan (born 1968)
 Hanuman Prasad Mishra
 Anant Kunte

Sarangi players in Pakistan
 Allah Rakha (1932-2000)
 Bundu Khan (1880-1955)
 Nathu Khan (1920-1971)

Other sarangi players
Yuji Nakagawa, Sarangi – a Japanese citizen who learnt to play the instrument in India under the tutelage of Dhruba Ghosh

See also
Esraj
Sarinda
Hindustani music

References

Further reading
 Bor, Joep, 1987: "The Voice of the Sarangi", comprising National Centre for the Performing Arts Quarterly Journal 15 (3–4), December 1986 and March 1987 (special combined issue), Bombay: NCPA
 Magriel, Nicolas, 1991 Sarangi Style in North Indian Music (published Ph.D. thesis), London: University of London, available on amazon.com
 Qureshi, Regula Burckhardt, 1997: “The Indian Sarangi: Sound of Affect, Site of Contest”, Yearbook for Traditional Music, pp. 1–38
 Sorrell, Neil (with Ram Narayan), 1980: Indian Music in Performance, Bolton:  Manchester University Press

External links 

Resham Firiri A popular Nepali folk music with a Sarangi and madal.
sarangi.info – downloadable sarangi and vocal music, including the integral of two important books, The Voice of the Sarangi by Joep Bor and Indian Music in Performance and Practice by Ram Narayan and Neil Sorrell.
Growing into Music – includes several films by Nicolas Magriel on Indian musical enculturation including films about the sarangi players, Farooq Latif Khan (b. 1975), Sarwar Hussain Khan (b. 1981), Mohammed Ali Khan, Sarangi (d. 2002), Ghulam Sabir Qadri (1922-), Vidya Sahai Mishra (d. 2019), Siddiqui Ahmed Khan (1914-), Ghulam Sabir Khan (b. 1948), Murad Ali (b. 1977), Faiyaz Khan (Varanasi), Zakan Khan (Varanasi) and Kanhaiyalal Mishra (Varanasi).
Sarangi, Gujarat, 19th century
Sarangi, ca. 1900
Sarangi, North India, late 19th century

Bowed instruments
Hindustani musical instruments
Nepalese musical instruments
String instruments with sympathetic strings
Drumhead lutes

Chordophones